Aiouea obscura is a species of plant in the family Lauraceae endemic to Costa Rica. The species occurs on the southern Pacific slopes, south-east of Palmar north.

References

obscura
Endemic flora of Costa Rica
Endangered plants
Taxonomy articles created by Polbot